Doraemon is a popular Japanese manga and anime series created by Fujiko F. Fujio and published by Shogakukan. The series has been released in many parts of the world.

America

English-language Americas

Brazil
The 1979 series had a first distribution attempt by Everest Video in the late 1980s, but the acquisition did not materialize due to the high cost of license at that time. In October 1992, distributed by WTC Comunicações, Doraemon was broadcast under the Doraemon, O Super-Gato Portuguese title on Rede Manchete children program Clube da Criança. However, the number of dubbed episodes was less and the series was not successful. In 2001, Creative Licensing tried to redistribute the series on television, but was unsuccessful.

In 2014, Sato Company in association with Rose Entertainment from Mexico, distributed the 2005 series under the Doraemon, O Gato do Futuro Portuguese title.

Spanish-language Latin America
The 1979 series was licensed by Rose Entertainment in 1999 for the entire Latin American region. A Latin American Spanish dub produced in Mexico under the Doraemon, el gato cósmico Spain's title has been distributed in most countries. In 2014, Rose Entertainment licensed the 2005 series under the same title.

Asia

Europe

Middle East

The show was first broadcast in Arab countries in 1995. Since 7 March 2016 a dub of the Doraemon 2005 series airs on Spacetoon.

Doraemon in Arabic: ("Abqoor" , which means a mini Genius)

 Algeria
 Libya
 Oman
 Qatar
 Saudi Arabia
 Tunisia
 United Arab Emirates
 Bahrain

In Iran, it was broadcast on IRIB TV1 under the name, .

Oceania

References

N